Thomas Pryde (October 26, 1888 – January 5, 1958) was a Scottish-Canadian politician who was a Member of Provincial Parliament in Legislative Assembly of Ontario from 1945 to 1958. He represented the riding of Huron for the Ontario Progressive Conservative Party. He was born in Largoward, Fife, Scotland and was a businessman. He died in office in 1958.

References

1888 births
1958 deaths
Progressive Conservative Party of Ontario MPPs
British emigrants to Canada